No. 12 Hill, or Hung Hom Hill, is a hill in Kowloon, Hong Kong, between King's Park and Lo Lung Hang, northwest of Hung Hom and southeast of Ho Man Tin. The Oi Man Estate was built on No. 12 Hill in stages between 1974 and 1975. The place is sometimes referred as King's Park Hill Level.

Streets and places in No. 12 Hill

Streets
Carmel Village Street
Chi Man Street
Chung Hau Street
Chung Yee Street
Fat Kwong Street
Good Shepherd Street
Hau Man Street
Oi Sen Path
Housing estates
Cascades
Chun Man Court
Oi Man Estate

Leisure facilities
Fat Kwong Street Sport Centre
Ho Man Tin Leisure Centre
Ho Man Tin Park
King's Park High Level Service Reservoir Playground
Chung Yee Street Garden

Public and community services
Auxiliary Medical Services Headquarters
Civil Engineering & Development Building
Ho Man Tin Government Offices
Hong Kong Housing Authority Headquarters
Hung Hom Divisional Police Station
Martha Boss Community Centre
Society for the Prevention of Cruelty to Animals (Hong Kong) Kowloon Centre

Education
Educational institutions in No. 12 Hill include:
Carmel Secondary School
Holy Trinity Church Secondary School
Ling To Catholic Primary School
Open University of Hong Kong (Main Campus)
Sheng Kung Hui Tsoi Kung Po Secondary School

Transportation
Princess Margaret Road
Oi Man Bus Terminus
Ho Man Tin station

See also
 List of mountains, peaks and hills in Hong Kong

References

Mountains, peaks and hills of Hong Kong
Kowloon City District